Mookuthi Amman is a 2020 Indian Tamil-language fantasy comedy film written and directed by RJ Balaji in his directorial debut. Co-directed by N. J. Saravanan, the film stars Nayanthara and Balaji, with Urvashi, Smruthi Venkat, Madhu Mailankody, Abinaya, Moulee and Ajay Ghosh in supporting roles. It revolves around a news anchor joining forces with the title character to expose a godman as fake. The film was released on Disney+ Hotstar on 14 November 2020, Diwali day.

Plot 
Engels Ramasamy, a Nagercoil-based news anchor, lives with his single mother, paternal grandfather and three sisters. Many girls rejected Engels’ marriage proposal because his family is poor and his father abandoned him. One day, the family plans to leave for the Venkateswara Temple, Tirupati for the fourth time, only to cancel it as the youngest sister has got of age. They soon realise that they should go to their family deity Mookuthi Amman's temple to seek good luck. The temple is located in a hilly area called Vellimalai, 13.9 kilometres away from Nagercoil. So they head there but find the temple dilapidated. The family cleans the temple, and as per the custom, they stay for the night. During their sleep, Mookuthi Amman appears in human form at the temple, which Engels witnesses. He soon realises that only he can see her as he is a god-chosen child. She decides to improve the family's life, but in return, Engels must popularise her temple. After he complies, he decides to make his family members' dreams come true with the help of Amman, and both Engels and Amman head back to Nagercoil by bus.

After reaching home, Engels asks the eldest of the three sisters what she wants. Engels asked her that question because she had made pongal, from milk flowing out of an ant-hill near the temple which Amman liked and the ant-hill made the temple famous. That Pongal later became the prasadam at the temple. A fair was organized after that, with concerts by singer L. R. Eswari. The eldest sister asks for a day-off as she dropped out of school, she has been the house's homemaker and has never enjoyed life like the other family members. Amman also tells him that not all men appreciate what women do for them every day. After that, he guarantees her sister weekly Sunday holidays.

Bhagavathi Baba, a godman, enters the Mookuthi Amman temple and announces that he will build a town named Panchavanam, which will destroy 148 villages around the temple in Vellimalai. This angers Engels, who has always tried to reveal his scams for the past six years. Amman decides to help Engels expose Baba. The next day, she makes herself visible to Engels' family members. They soon decide to take down Baba together. Once, Engels goes to a meeting with Baba but sees his father as a follower of Baba who lied to his family that he fled him. He narrates the story to his mother. When Amman makes a plan, and according to the plan, Engels' mother and sisters infiltrate Baba's group posing as Baba followers and start taking videos of him behaving badly in front of the other members without him noticing. Engels gets employed at Star Vijay and does a daily show with Baba, in which people phone him and look for solutions to their issues.

During the first episode, a man phones Baba to convince his father to take his kidney at the hospital, but the man married a girl of another religion and as a result, does not want his kidney. Baba then tells the father that he has done the right thing in not accepting his kidney, thus proving that he is a bigot. Later on, Engels proves to the public that Baba's Panchavanam project is against the laws and that Baba does not even know a line of the Bhagavad Gita.

The next day, Engels reveals even more dark truths about Baba. Baba then challenges Engels to answer three questions at the groundbreaking ceremony of Panchavanam, and if he answers those questions, he will not launch Panchavanam. After the episode's filming, Baba learns of Engels' family's plans to stop him. Engels immediately tells the others to escape Baba's class. But during the escape, their car runs out of fuel, and Baba's henchmen catch them. Engels calls for Amman, and she kills the henchmen using her powers, allowing the family to reach Panchavanam's groundbreaking ceremony in time. There, Baba reveals that the extraordinary events that made the Mookuthi Amman temple famous were all staged by Engels, even though the events happened miraculously without human intervention. When asked why he staged the events, Mookuthi Amman comes in the form of a woman and arrives at the stage. She exposes him by telling everyone that there is no need for men like Baba to protect God, and everyone should pray to God out of faith and not fear, after which she disappears into dust. After her speech, Baba becomes a public enemy. The next day, Amman spots Engels travelling in a bike and asks him for his final wish before returning to her abode. He replies that he is grateful for what he has, and Amman vanishes into dust. Engels then tells the viewers that God will surely come, because you too are God's chosen child.

Cast

Production

Development 
After completing work on LKG (2019), RJ Balaji wanted his next film to be something like the Hindi films OMG – Oh My God! (2012) and PK (2014), "a film with a message in it but very relevant to the time we live in". He initially wanted to remake PK in Tamil, but later decided against doing so since the remake rights equalled his entire budget. Keeping the theme of PK in mind, which was about "the god that created us versus the god we have created", he wrote an original story which became Mookuthi Amman. The film is Balaji's directorial debut, while N. J. Saravanan serves as co-director; it was produced by Ishari K. Ganesh under Vels Films International, photographed by Dinesh Krishnan, and edited by R. K. Selva. Stunt Silva served as the action choreographer.

Casting 
Balaji initially wanted an established actress like Anushka Shetty or Nayanthara to portray the title character, but did not approach them. He then narrated the story to Shruti Haasan, who liked it and said she would do the role. However, when Nayanthara called Balaji and liked the story he narrated to her, she agreed and was signed on. Balaji wanted Hariharan to portray the antagonist Bhagavathi Baba, but later decided on Ajay Ghosh after watching his performance in a Telugu film and realising "he is too good as a comedian as well". Urvashi was Balaji's first choice to play his mother Paalthangam, and despite scheduling conflicts with another film, agreed to work on this film and allocated dates.

Filming 
Principal photography began in November 2019, although Nayanthara joined the sets only in December. Filming wrapped in February 2020. Separate scenes involving actors Gautham Karthik and Manobala were shot but not included in the final cut.

Themes 
Balaji described Mookuthi Amman as having "all the elements that were there in the devotional films that we grew up watching." He said it would be "a nostalgic trip, but there will also be a takeaway that is relevant, especially in this present times" without satirising the genre. The name of Balaji's character Engels Ramaswamy is derived from two rationalists: Friedrich Engels and E. V. Ramaswamy.

Music 
The music is composed by Girishh G. with lyrics written by Pa. Vijay. The first single "Aadi Kuththu", sung by L. R. Eswari, was released on 2 November 2020. Another single "Bhagavathi Baba", sung by Anthony Daasan, was released on 5 November. The full album was released by Think Music on 7 November 2020. For the Telugu-dubbed version Ammoru Thalli, the lyrics were written by Rahman.

Release 
Mookuthi Amman was scheduled to release in theatres on 8 May 2020, but was then postponed due to the COVID-19 pandemic. In late October 2020, it was announced that the film would be having a direct-to-digital release via Disney+ Hotstar, on the occasion of Diwali, 14 November 2020. The film's digital rights were acquired for ₹20 Crores. The Telugu-dubbed version Ammoru Thalli was released on the same day, and premiered on Star Maa on 7 March 2021, and registered an average TRP rating of 6.62. The Tamil version of the film was telecast through Vijay TV on 14 April 2021, and the Malayalam version premiered on Asianet on 18 April 2021.

Reception 
Baradwaj Rangan of Film Companion South wrote, "If Balaji wants to write a serious film about us and God, then that's his prerogative. But this film, with its wild shifts in tone, never finds its footing". K. Janani of India Today wrote, "Mookuthi Amman is a clever and smart Amman film that is relevant in today's times and questions several important issues plaguing the country." Manoj Kumar R of The Indian Express wrote, "There is not a single dull moment in Mookuthi Amman even when things don't add up in terms of logic or continuity. And it is one of the redeeming qualities of Mookuthi Amman."

Srivatsan S. of The Hindu wrote, "Balaji operates within the limitations – both as an actor and writer – that may have worked in his favour to a certain extent in LKG and now, in Mookuthi Amman." Nandini Ramnath of Scroll.in wrote, "The humour, mostly rumbustious and occasionally sly, is superbly performed by the cast. While Balaji makes a convincing truth-seeker, Urvashi hogs the show as his garrulous and addle-brained mother. Nayanthara is perfect as the glamorous goddess with an enviable wardrobe and jewellery collection and her own special back-light, which bathes her in an irresistible glow."

References

External links 
 
 

2020 direct-to-video films
2020 films
2020s fantasy comedy films
2020s Tamil-language films
Disney+ Hotstar original films
Films about journalists
Films not released in theaters due to the COVID-19 pandemic
Films postponed due to the COVID-19 pandemic
Indian fantasy comedy films